The Bell Mercantile, a two-story store building at 101-111 Moffat Avenue in Oak Creek, Colorado, was built in 1910 by Samuel and Edward Bell on their ranch property.  It served as a company store to a "vast number of coal miners" in the area, as coal mines paid employees through the store.  The store subtracted charges for store purchases before paying balances of paychecks to the workers.  It included a bank and later served as a doctor's office.  It was listed on the National Register of Historic Places in 1990.

It is a wood-frame building with a flat roof, and it is clad in original shiplap siding.  It was deemed significant as a mostly "unaltered example of the vernacular commercial buildings which were once prevalent in Colorado's mountain communities", which were built in the early 1900s.  It was also deemed significant for its association with the "history of commerce in Oak Creek".  It was one of just three businesses in Bell Town, which was incorporated in 1907 as Oak Creek.

References

National Register of Historic Places in Routt County, Colorado
Buildings and structures completed in 1910
Company stores in the United States